Binary Star is a hip-hop project by rapper One Be Lo (also known as OneManArmy), and was formerly a duo with rapper Senim Silla. The pair met and formed the group in 1998 during their time in Hiawatha Correctional Facility.

History
Binary Star's debut effort, Waterworld, was produced on a $500 budget and released in 1999, under the label Terrorist Records. An extensive tour of Michigan followed, as both members of the duo were on parole and were not permitted to leave the state. The purpose behind Waterworld was to raise money to produce a "real album", Masters of the Universe.

Masters of the Universe was essentially a remixed version of Waterworld, but garnered more attention, selling over 20,000 copies. However, Binary Star disbanded shortly thereafter, citing creative differences, though they reunited in 2002 to perform at Middlebury College in Middlebury, Vermont, They toured together again in 2009-10.

In 2013, Binary Star released its first album since Masters of the Universe, a self-titled EP to celebrate the duo's 15th anniversary.

In 2017, One Be Lo released Water World 3 under the Binary Star name, though without Senim Silla's participation. The album instead featured several guests including Mahogany Jones, Mic Phelps, and Malaki. The album was produced by Decompoze, who also produced most of Masters of the Universe, and One Be Lo.

Discography
Waterworld (1999, Terrorist Records)
Masters of the Universe (2000, Subterraneous Records)
Binary Star EP (2013)
Water World 3 (2017)
Lighty / Ears Apart (2018, double album)

One Be Lo
WaterWorld Too (2001, Subterraneous Records)
Project: F.E.T.U.S. (2002, Subterraneous Records)
S.O.N.O.G.R.A.M. (2005, Fat Beats/ Subterraneous Records)
S.T.I.L.L.B.O.R.N. (2005, Trackezoids/ Subterraneous Records)
The R.E.B.I.R.T.H. (2007, Subterraneous Records)
L.A.B.O.R. (2011, Subterraneous Records)
K.I.C.K. P.U.S.H. (2012, Subterraneous Records)

Senim Silla
The Name, The Motto, The Outcome (2007, Infinite Rhythm Network)

References

External links
[ Binary Star] at Allmusic
Binary Star November 20, 2009 San Francisco concert info

Alternative hip hop groups
American hip hop groups
Musical groups established in 1998
1998 establishments in Michigan
American musical duos
Hip hop duos
Musical groups from Michigan
Midwest hip hop groups